George Cholmondeley, 2nd Earl of Cholmondeley, PC, FRS (1666 – 7 May 1733), styled The Honourable from birth until 1715 and then known as Lord Newborough to 1725, was an English soldier. Cholmondeley was the second son of Robert Cholmondeley, 1st Viscount Cholmondeley, and Elizabeth Cradock. Hugh Cholmondeley, 1st Earl of Cholmondeley, was his elder brother. He was educated at Westminster School and Christ Church, Oxford. Cholmondeley supported the claim of William of Orange and Mary to the English throne and after their accession he was appointed a Groom of the Bedchamber.

Military and political career
In 1690 he commanded the Horse Grenadier Guards at the Battle of the Boyne and two years later he fought at the Battle of Steenkerque. From 1690 to 1695 he represented Newton in the House of Commons. Cholmondeley was promoted to Brigadier-General in 1697, to Major-General in 1702, to Lieutenant-General in 1704 and to General in 1727.

Honours and titles
He was admitted to the Privy Council in 1706 and in 1715 he was raised to the Peerage of Ireland as Baron Newborough, of Newborough in the County of Wexford. One year later he was created Baron Newburgh, of Newburgh in the County of Anglesea, in the Peerage of Great Britain, and in 1725 Cholmondeley succeeded his elder brother as second Earl of Cholmondeley. He also succeeded him as Lord Lieutenant of Cheshire, Anglesey, Caernarvonshire, Denbighshire, Flintshire, Merionetshire and Montgomeryshire, posts he held until his death.

Family
Lord Cholmondeley married Anna Elizabeth van Ruytenburgh (c. 1672 – London, 16 January 1722), daughter of Aelbert Heer van Ruytenburgh (1630–1688) and Wilhelmina Anna van Nassau (1638–1688), around 1701. They had three sons and three daughters. He died in May 1733 and was succeeded in his titles by his eldest son George.

References

Kidd, Charles, Williamson, David (editors). Debrett's Peerage and Baronetage (1990 edition). New York: St Martin's Press, 1990, 

 

|-

|-

1666 births
1733 deaths
Alumni of Christ Church, Oxford
British Army generals
British Life Guards officers
Lord-Lieutenants of Anglesey
Lord-Lieutenants of Cheshire
Lord-Lieutenants of Caernarvonshire
Lord-Lieutenants of Denbighshire
Lord-Lieutenants of Flintshire
Lord-Lieutenants of Merionethshire
Lord-Lieutenants of Montgomeryshire
English MPs 1690–1695
Members of the Privy Council of Great Britain
Members of the Privy Council of Ireland
People educated at Westminster School, London
Younger sons of viscounts
Williamite military personnel of the Williamite War in Ireland
Fellows of the Royal Society
George
2
Peers of Ireland created by George I
Peers of Great Britain created by George I